Federal Route 87, or Jalan Mentakab-Temerloh, is a main federal road in Pahang, Malaysia. The 15.6 km (9.1 mi) roads connects Mentakab until Temerloh. The roads was called Federal Route 2 before Mentakab-Temerloh Bypass was built in 1978.

Route background
The Kilometre Zero of the Federal Route 87 starts at Mentakab South, at its interchange with the Federal Route 2, the main trunk road of the central of Peninsula Malaysia.

History

In 1971, the old Temerloh Bridge spanning across the Pahang River collapsed due to the huge flood in Temerloh. As a result, the Malaysian Public Works Department (JKR) constructed a 575-m replacement bridge known as the Sultan Ahmad Shah Bridge FT2 beside the old bridge. The Sultan Ahmad Shah Bridge was much higher than the old bridge, forming the first grade-separated interchange in Pahang that was linked to the Federal Route 10. The new bridge project also included a new roadway that bypassed Temerloh and Mentakab, causing the former Temerloh-Mentakab section to be re-gazetted as the Federal Route 87. The construction of the Sultan Ahmad Shah Bridge was completed in 1974.

Features

At most sections, the Federal Route 87 was built under the JKR R5 road standard, allowing maximum speed limit of up to 90 km/h.

List of junctions and towns

References

Malaysian Federal Roads